Mejdi Traoui (born December 13, 1983 in Sousse) is a Tunisian footballer.

Career
On May 1, 2008, Traoui signed a contract at Red Bull Salzburg until summer 2011. He made two substitute appearances in the Austrian Bundesliga for Red Bull Salzburg during 2008. In January 2009 he was loaned to Al-Wehda for the remainder of the season.

International career
Traoui was part of the Tunisia 2004 Olympic football team, which exited in the first round, finishing third in group C, behind group and gold medal winners Argentina and runners-up Australia.

Traoui was picked by Tunisia for the 2008 Africa Cup of Nations. He scored a late equaliser, during Tunisia's 2-2 draw with Senegal during the first round of games in Tunisia's group D, on January 23.

References

External links

1983 births
Living people
Tunisian footballers
Association football midfielders
Footballers at the 2004 Summer Olympics
Olympic footballers of Tunisia
Tunisia international footballers
2008 Africa Cup of Nations players
Étoile Sportive du Sahel players
Al-Wehda Club (Mecca) players
Espérance Sportive de Tunis players
2011 African Nations Championship players
2012 Africa Cup of Nations players
FC Red Bull Salzburg players
2013 Africa Cup of Nations players
Expatriate footballers in Austria
Expatriate footballers in Saudi Arabia
Tunisian expatriate sportspeople in Austria
Tunisian expatriate sportspeople in Saudi Arabia
Tunisia A' international footballers
People from Sousse